American singer Gwen Stefani has released four studio albums, two extended plays, 32 singles (including nine as a featured artist), five promotional singles, one video album, and 28 music videos. She has sold more than nine million albums as a solo artist. Stefani is also the lead singer of the rock band No Doubt, with which she has released several albums.

Stefani began to record solo material in early 2003, and her debut solo album Love. Angel. Music. Baby. was released in November 2004. It debuted on the US Billboard 200 at number seven, and reached multi-platinum status in the United States, the United Kingdom, Australia, and Canada. The first single released from the album was "What You Waiting For?", which charted in the top 10 in most of the countries in which it was released. "Rich Girl" was released as the album's second single, a collaboration with rapper Eve; it was successful on several formats, and reached the top 10 in the UK and the US. The third single "Hollaback Girl" became Stefani's first US and second Australian number-one single; it was less successful elsewhere. The fourth single "Cool" was released shortly after but it did not perform as well as its predecessor, failing to reach the top 10 in the US and UK. "Luxurious" was released as the album's fifth single, but did not perform as well as its predecessors. "Crash" was released in early 2006 as the album's sixth single in lieu of Love. Angel. Music. Baby.'''s sequel, which was delayed by Stefani's pregnancy. It charted only in the US.

Stefani released her second album The Sweet Escape in December 2006; it spawned five singles from October 2006 to October 2007. The album's music contains new wave and dance music influences similar to that of its predecessor, while also exploring more modern pop sounds. The first single released from the album was "Wind It Up", which peaked in the top 20 in most of the countries in which it was released. The second single, "The Sweet Escape", featuring rapper Akon, peaked in the top 10 of most charts, reaching number two in the US and UK. "4 in the Morning" was released as the album's third single; managing a top 30 placement on the US Pop chart but failing to reach the top 40 of the Billboard Hot 100. Although, the single went-on to become a top ten success in Australia and New Zealand. "Now That You Got It", a hybrid song featuring reggae artist Damian Marley, also had a less than stellar chart performance; it did not make the top 20 anywhere except Norway and failed to chart in the US. The album's fifth and final single, "Early Winter", was released across only mainland Europe and charted moderately well. On the same day as Stefani released The Sweet Escape, she also released Harajuku Lovers Live on DVD, a recording of a concert performed in November 2005 in Anaheim, California as part of her Harajuku Lovers Tour.

In late 2014, Stefani released two non-album singles, "Baby Don't Lie" on October 20, 2014, and "Spark the Fire" on December 1, 2014. "Baby Don't Lie" received moderate success on commercial charts, while "Spark the Fire" only charted on the Dance Club Songs chart. Stefani was a featured singer on Eminem's single, "Kings Never Die", which was written specifically for the 2015 film Southpaw. On October 20, 2015, Stefani released the lead single for her third studio album, This Is What the Truth Feels Like, "Used to Love You". "Make Me Like You" and "Misery" were also released from the album. Stefani's fourth album and first Christmas album is You Make It Feel Like Christmas'' and was preceded by the release of the title track, a duet with Blake Shelton in 2017. All of the album's seventeen songs entered the Holiday Digital Songs chart in the United States. Stefani and Shelton have released three other collaborations, including "Go Ahead and Break My Heart" (2016) and "Nobody but You" (2019), which peaked at numbers 70 and 18 in the United States, respectively. In July 2020, they released "Happy Anywhere".

Studio albums

Extended plays

Singles

As lead artist

As featured artist

Promotional singles

Other charted songs

Guest appearances

Videography

Video albums

Music videos

See also
 No Doubt discography

Notes

References

External links
 
 
 
 

Discography
Discographies of American artists
Pop music discographies